The Contrast are a guitar power pop band based in Peterborough, Cambridgeshire, in the United Kingdom. They were formed in 1999 by David Reid and have since released five albums on the New York-based label Rainbow Quartz and two for Wicked Cool Records. Since the release of their second album Wireless Days, their music has been regularly played by Little Steven on his Underground Garage radio show. Little Steven once described them on air as "One of the best bands on the planet – and England too" and consequently invited them to play the Underground Garage Festival on Randall's Island in 2004. In May 2007, they released a new album called Underground Ghosts (also on Rainbow Quartz) that has since been regularly featured on Little Steven's Underground Garage show. A compilation of tracks from all of the Rainbow Quartz albums was released in 2007. This contains new and unreleased tracks and is the band's first release on Little Steven's "Wicked Cool" label. The band's song "Mystery #1" was featured on a Wicked Cool compilation album, The Coolest Songs In The World- Vol 2.

The Contrast's sixth album (the first full-length album for Wicked Cool Records and featuring Little Steven as executive producer), God of Malfunction, was released on 13 April 2010.

Personnel

(2014-present)
The current line-up consists of:
David Reid:- vocals/lead guitar
Thorin 'Fozzy' Dixon:- drums
Richard Mackman:- bass/vocals
Simon Russell:- keyboards

Other members
Kieran Wade:- guitar/vocals
Matthew Zilch:- guitar/vocals (2004–2006)
Andy Hawkins:- drums/keyboards/vocals (2005)
James Crossley:- drums (1999–2004)
Spencer Hart:- guitar/vocals (2000–2004)
Chris Corney:- bass/vocals (1999–2000)
Paul Blant:- drums (1999)

Collaborators
Spike Smith:- drums (2005)
Jo Parsons:- drums (2004)

Discography

Albums

Mystery #1 (Rainbow Quartz, 2000)
Perfect Disguise (3:56)
Short Term Memory (3:03)
57 (3:35)
She's Been Here Before (2:28)
You Never Listen (2:31)
Mystery No. 1 (2:58)
Mad Professor (3:38)
Falldown (3:39)
Independence (4:53)
Turn Off the Sun (2:47)
Publicity Stunts (4:19)
Bad Dreams (2:59)
Remember (3:51)
Friend for a Day (2:56)

Wireless Days (Rainbow Quartz, 2002)
Can't Stand the Light (3:12)
Wireless Days (3:05)
Fortune (4:09)
Mask (2:32)
What You Want (3:03)
Ansaphone (2:47)
Unfair Game (3:05)
Charlie Grey (3:20)
Drop Dead Gorgeous Love Song (4:01)
Late Train (3:07)
Cover (4:14)
Elvis Fix (5:34)

Fade Back In (Rainbow Quartz, 2004)
Give Me One More Chance (3:02)
George Zipp (2:45)
Forget It (3:53)
The Guilty Party (3:25)
Catch the Spark (3:04)
Your Starring Role (3:40)
Functional Punk Pop Song (2:21)
Something Tells Me (5:03)
Flatpacked (2:26)
Smart (2:35)
Everything Seems to Get Me (3:22)
Disconnected (2:33)

Forget to Tell the Time (Rainbow Quartz, 2005)
Caught in a Trap (2:42)
Forget to Tell the Time (2:47)
Different Again (3:39)
Ink (2:45)
Adversity (4:08)
Side FX (2:27)
Mean (3:04)
Someone Else's Logo (2:43)
Hold Your Fire (4:12)
Care (2:22)
Big Dark Nowhere (3:50)
Trying to Fill the Space (3:48)
What You Have Done (3:39)
Be There (4:10)

Underground Ghosts (Rainbow Quartz, 2007)
Everyone's A Sucker
My Peace Of Mind
I've Known Your Name Forever
What Do I know
Pocketful Of Fear
Clue
Blast Off In Primetime
Something Isn't
Breaking Promises And Hearts
Shine
Believe
The World Of Being Wrong

Perfect Disguise: Introducing the Contrast (Wicked Cool Records, 2007)
Mystery #1
Mask
Unfair Game
World's So Different
Can't Stand The Light
Caught In A Trap
George Zipp
Perfect Disguise
Perfect Disguise (Acoustic)
Believe
How To Tell
Ansaphone
57
Big Dark Nowhere
Disconnected
Mystery #1 (Acoustic)

God of Malfunction (Wicked Cool Records, 2010)
Underground Ghosts
Coming Back to Life
Take Me Apart
I Am An Alien
Gone Forever
God of Malfunction
Good Luck Charms
Better Than They Seem
She's A Disaster
Thought You Were Strong
Unexpected
False Admission

A Sinister Flick (Angel Air Records, 2013)
We Are The Monsters
Balloon Man
Mr Antenna
The Corndog King
Saving My breath
Heavens To Murgatroyd
Days Of Wonder
Doctor Strange
Johnny The Torch
Stick Man
A Sinister Flick
Mr Snake
Ghost Man
Incredible Girl
Maze Of Memories
There’s Always A Chance

Madhouse of Inventions (Secret Shark Records, 2018)
Bureaucrats
Madhouse of Inventions
The Holy Grail
Your Secret
Before This Caper Goes Down
The Vulture Squadron
What Do You Get
Pigless Head
Updates
Sinister London
Passion
Demons From Your Id
Atmosphere
River of Infra-Red Light
Intelligent Life
This Final Day

References

External links
 Official home page
 

English indie rock groups
English power pop groups